The Needles Ferry is a cable ferry across Lower Arrow Lake in the West Kootenay region of southeastern British Columbia.

Timeline
1913: Farmers built the first vehicle ferry using Ford Model T parts. Apart from a reference to a rudimentary raft in 1922, no evidence exists of a service most years.
1924: Government ferry launched, which comprised a log raft pushed by a launch. This free service, had a one-car capacity.
1928: Larger boat introduced.
1931: Wooden hulled cable ferry installed, having three-car capacity. Crossings were hourly.
1941: Upgraded to eight-car capacity.
1952: Upgraded to 16-car capacity.
1955: Service increased from 12 to 24 hours per day.
1967: Replacement bridge confirmed, but never eventuated.
1968: Both terminals rebuilt on submerging by the reservoir for the Keenleyside Dam.
1969: Diesel-powered Needles with 28-car capacity introduced.
1990: Needles relocated to Upper Arrow Lake Ferry route. Replaced by a 40-vehicle, 150-passenger cable ferry. At  was longest haul cable in North America.
2002: Service reduced to 17 hours per day.
2004: Western Pacific Marine became the service contractor.
c.2013: WaterBridge Ferries became the service provider.
2019: Ferry crew observed a submerged pickup truck just off the Needles ferry landing.

Patronage

Operation
The ferry operates under private contract with the British Columbia Ministry of Transportation and is free of tolls, as are all inland ferries in British Columbia.

Departures are every thirty minutes, from the first at 5 am until the last at 10 pm, with a crossing time of about five minutes. The ferry has capacity for 40 vehicles and 135 passengers.

See also
Steamboats of the Arrow Lakes
List of Inland Ferries in British Columbia

Footnotes

References

Ferries of British Columbia
Arrow Lakes
Crossings of the Columbia River
Cable ferries in Canada
1913 establishments in British Columbia